Lupo is a surname of Italian origin, meaning "wolf", which is derived from the Latin lupus. Its Spanish equivalent is López, its Portuguese equivalent is Lopes, its French equivalent is Loup, and its Romanian equivalent is Lupu or Lupescu.

The name may refer to:

People
Alberto Lupo (1924–1984), Italian film actor
Anthony Lupo (born 1966), professor of atmospheric science at the University of Missouri
Francis Lupo (1895–1918), American soldier killed in World War I
Frank Lupo, American television writer and producer
Ignazio Lupo (1877–1947), Sicilian-American gangster
Janet Lupo (1950-2017), American model, Playboy Playmate 1975
Michael Lupo (1953–1995), Italian serial killer in the UK
Salvatore Lupo (born 1951), Italian author
Lupo family, a family of court musicians in England in the 16th and 17th centuries

Fictional characters
Cyrus Lupo, on the American television series Law & Order
Jo Lupo, on the American television series Eureka

Surnames of Italian origin
Italian-language surnames